"Deck the Halls" is a Christmas carol.

Deck the Halls may also refer to:

 Deck the Halls (2005 film), a Canadian made-for-TV Christmas film starring Gabrielle Carteris and Steve Bacic
 Deck the Halls (2006 film), an American family comedy film starring Danny DeVito and Matthew Broderick
 Deck the Halls (novel), a 2003 thriller by Mary Higgins Clark and Carol Higgins Clark
 Deck the Halls (2011 film), a made-for-TV film based on the 2003 novel, directed by Ron Underwood

See also
 Deck the Halls, Bruise Your Hand, an album by Relient K